Inigo Ros Añón (born 21 October 1982) is a Spanish former professional footballer who played as a midfielder.

Club career
Born in Tudela, Navarre, Ros began his professional career at Real Sociedad, making his senior debut with the B team in the 2001–02 season, in the Segunda División B. He played a further three and a half years with the Basques before joining Real Jaén in January 2006, acting as captain of the latter.

Ros spent the following four campaigns competing with the Andalusians, leaving in June 2010 and signing with SD Eibar also in the third division. In July 2012 he moved to fellow league club CD Tenerife, finishing his first season with 40 appearances (playoffs included) as the Canarians returned to Segunda División after a two-year absence.

On 29 September 2013, aged nearly 31, Ros played his first professional match, starting in a 1–0 home win over Real Madrid Castilla. He scored his first league goal on 10 November, in a 2–0 victory against former side Eibar also at the Estadio Heliodoro Rodríguez López.

On 6 July 2014, Ros moved to third-tier SD Huesca.

Personal life
Ros' younger brother, Javier, was also a footballer and a midfielder. He also represented Real Sociedad B and Eibar.

References

External links

1982 births
Living people
Spanish footballers
Footballers from Navarre
Association football midfielders
Segunda División players
Segunda División B players
Tercera División players
Real Sociedad B footballers
Real Jaén footballers
SD Eibar footballers
CD Tenerife players
SD Huesca footballers
CD Tudelano footballers